Boutell or Boutelle is a surname. It may refer to:

Persons
Boutell
Charles Boutell (1812–1877), an English archaeologist and heraldic scholar
Elizabeth Boutell (1650–1715), a British actress
Henry Sherman Boutell (1856–1926), an American lawyer and diplomat
Mary E. C. Boutell, illustrator from the United Kingdom
Sir Francis Hepburn Chevallier-Boutell (1851-1937), British engineer and sports manager
Boutelle
Charles A. Boutelle (1839–1901), American seaman, shipmaster, naval officer, Civil War veteran, newspaper editor, publisher
Frazier Boutelle (1840–1924), US Army officer, fighting in the Civil War and the Indian Wars and working as a recruiter in World War I. Later Superintendent of Yellowstone National Park
Paul Boutelle (1934–2016), American politician, Socialist Workers Party candidate for U.S. vice president in 1968 with presidential candidate Fred Halstead

Others
Boutell-Hathorn House, historic house and farm in Wilmington, Massachusetts